Başbağlar can refer to:

 Başbağlar, Erzincan
 Başbağlar, Oltu